Anlamani was a king of the Kingdom of Kush in Nubia, who ruled from 620 BC and died around 600 BC.

Under his reign, Kush experienced a revival in its power. Anlamani was the son of Senkamanisken, his predecessor, and the elder brother of Aspelta, his successor.
Anlamani used titles based on those of the Egyptian pharaohs.

Reign

Anlamani is particularly well known from a stela discovered in a temple at Kawa. The stela records his mother Nasalsa's visit to Kawa to watch his official coronation as king. It also notes his decision to make four of his sisters as "sistrum-players" in the National temple of Amun at Jebel Barkal and reports the king's campaign against certain nomadic tribes who threatened Kawa.

Two granite statues of this king have been found in Jebel Barkal while a block from Meroë bearing his name is known. One of the statues is today located in the National Museum of Khartoum, Sudan) while the other (a 12 foot high statue) is in the Boston Museum of Fine Arts. Anlamani was buried in pyramid Nu. 6 in Nuri. In his tomb stood a large chamber, decorated with religious texts, and his sarcophagus.

In 592 BC, under the reign of his brother Aspelta, the Egyptian king Psamtik II launched a campaign against Kush which resulted in the sack of Napata.

Image gallery

References

External links

 Anlamani
 Claude Rillyː Anlamani et l’accession au trône d’Aspelta, inː Histoire et civilisations du Soudan, Paris Saint-Pourçain-sur-Sioule : Soleb ; Éditions Bleu autour 2017, pp. 159-163 online

7th-century BC monarchs of Kush
6th-century BC monarchs of Kush
7th-century BC rulers